Megapsyrassa is a genus of beetles in the family Cerambycidae, containing the following species:

 Megapsyrassa atkinsoni Chemsak & Giesbert, 1986
 Megapsyrassa auricomis (Chemsak & Linsley, 1963)
 Megapsyrassa chiapaneca Giesbert, 1993
 Megapsyrassa linsleyi Chemsak & Giesbert, 1986
 Megapsyrassa puncticollis (Chemsak & Linsley, 1963)
 Megapsyrassa testacea Giesbert, 1993
 Megapsyrassa xestioides (Bates, 1872)

References

Elaphidiini